Incaspis is a genus of colubrid snakes endemic to South America.<ref>"'Incaspis ". The Reptile Database. www.reptile-database.org.</ref>

Species and geographic rangesIncaspis amaru  – EcuadorIncaspis simonsii  – Ecuador, PeruIncaspis tachymenoides''  – Chile, Peru - Schmidt's green racer

References

Incaspis
Snake genera